The 1972–73 ABA season was the sixth season of the American Basketball Association. The Pittsburgh Condors and Miami Floridians had folded, leaving the league with nine teams. However, the ABA decided to (for the first and only time) award an expansion franchise to Dr. Leonard Bloom (President and CEO of the United States Capital Corporation) for $1 million to play in San Diego, California, named the San Diego Conquistadors (however due to a feud they did not play in San Diego Sports Arena, instead playing at Peterson Gym). Subsequently, this meant that the Memphis Tams (formerly the Memphis Pros) would move to the Eastern Division. Once again, the best regular season team did not win the ABA Finals, with the Indiana Pacers (who had the 4th best record), led by playoff MVP George McGinnis, winning the ABA championship, 4 games to 3 over the Kentucky Colonels.

Standings

Eastern Division

Western Division

Asterisk (*) denotes playoff team

Bold - ABA Champions

Playoffs

Awards and honors

 ABA Most Valuable Player Award: Billy Cunningham, Carolina Cougars
 Rookie of the Year: Brian Taylor, New York Nets
 Coach of the Year: Larry Brown, Carolina Cougars
 Playoffs MVP: George McGinnis, Indiana Pacers
 All-Star Game MVP: Warren Jabali, Denver Rockets
 Executive of the Year: Carl Scheer, Carolina Cougars
All-ABA First Team 
 Billy Cunningham, Carolina Cougars
 Julius Erving, Virginia Squires (1st First Team selection, 2nd overall selection)
 Artis Gilmore, Kentucky Colonels (2nd selection)
 Jimmy Jones, Utah Stars
 Warren Jabali, Denver Rockets
All-ABA Second Team
 George McGinnis, Indiana Pacers
 Dan Issel, Kentucky Colonels (2nd Second Team selection, 3rd overall selection)
 Mel Daniels, Indiana Pacers (1st Second Team selection, 5th overall selection)
 Ralph Simpson, Denver Rockets (2nd selection)
 Mack Calvin, Carolina Cougars (1st Second Team selection, 2nd overall selection)
All-Defensive Team (beginning with this season)
 Joe Caldwell, Carolina Cougars
 Mike Gale, Kentucky Colonels
 Julius Keye, Denver Rockets
 Roland Taylor, Virginia Squires
 Willie Wise, Utah Stars
All-Rookie Team
Jim Chones, New York Nets
George Gervin, Virginia Squires
James Silas, Dallas Chaparrals
Brian Taylor, New York Nets
Dennis Wuycik, Carolina Cougars

References

 
ABA